LundXY Global Ventures is an angel investment and startup catalyst headquartered in Copenhagen, Denmark, founded by serial entrepreneur Morten Lund in 2007. By 2013, parts of the operation had been superseded by Lund's new OnlyXO network.

Activity 

The firm was founded in  2007, managing  a portfolio of companies in the fields of web and mobile telecommunications, content and media, financial services and clean technology.

It backed Nikolaj Nyholm's startup Imity (acquired by social networking site ZYB for an undisclosed sum in 2008, and his 2008 startup Polar Rose.  It also backed Aresa, a landmine detection startup. After field-testing in Serbia failed to produce the desired results, Aresa was shut down.

LundXY acquired  the  free daily newspaper, Nyhedsavisen  from the Icelandic investment firm Baugur GroupThe paper was in its time the most widely read newspaper in Denmark with a circulation of 550,000. The firm's stated goal was to transform the nature of printed press by merging  offline distribution with an attractive online presence. Despite this, finances continued to be an issue and the paper closed in August 2008.

LundXY's investment vehicle 'WILD,' for Worldwide Investment and Involvement in Life Development, included firms like AquaDania with its  system for water purification and Aresa A/S, a company that used genetically modified plants to detect landmines.

Morten Lund was declared bankrupt in January 2009 in the aftermath of the failure of Nyhedsavisen, but he announced that he was out of bankruptcy in April 2010.  LundXY was out of the spotlight during the term of Lund's personal bankruptcy, though he continues to have a blog on that site.

Portfolio 

Other companies that have appeared in the LundXY portfolio:

HelloGroup, an advertising agency in Scandinavia
Zecco.com, free online stock trading.
Maxthon, the most popular web browser in China
 Polar Rose,  facial recognition software
Bullguard  antivirus software
Wamba, the social movement

References

External links 
Nyhedsavisen Official Website
Skype Official Website
Clinton Global Initiative Official Website
World Economic Forum Tech Pioneers

 

Venture capital firms of Denmark
Companies based in Copenhagen